Găneasa may refer to several places in Romania:

 Găneasa, Ilfov, a commune in Ilfov County
 Găneasa, Olt, a commune in Olt County